Pancratium parvum is a bulbous ephemeral plant found in India.
Flowering season is May–June.

This herb can be 30–50 cm tall, bulb 4–5 cm.
Leaves 30–45 cm, linear
Flowers fragrant, 3-8 in umbel on slender scape 15–25 cm long; bracts 2, 5 cm, greenish white.
Filaments long; flowers opening at night.
Fruits 2 cm, globose, 3 lobed.   Occasionally found on cliffs in evergreen forest, semi-evergreen, moist deciduous forest.  The parvum has a bulb with neck and short stamens.

References

parvum
Flora of India (region)
Plants described in 1850
Taxa named by Nicol Alexander Dalzell